Hung Chia-chun (born 28 June 1977) is a Taiwanese taekwondo practitioner. She won a silver medal in lightweight at the 1997 World Taekwondo Championships.

References

External links

1977 births
Living people
Taiwanese female taekwondo practitioners
World Taekwondo Championships medalists
20th-century Taiwanese women